An upholstery hammer (also called a tack hammer) is a lightweight hammer used for securing upholstery fabric to furniture frames using tacks or small nails.

Many styles have two faces, one face usually being magnetized to aid in placement of tacks (this face has a split surface to make its magnetic hold stronger). Once started, the tacks are driven with the other face. To apply tacks rapidly an upholsterer will hold tacks in the mouth and spit them, head first, onto the magnetized face of the hammer.

Staple guns have largely replaced tacking as an upholstery technique.

Upholstery
Hammers
Woodworking hand tools
Hand tools